Wum is a town and commune in Cameroon. It is the capital of Menchum division in the Northwest Province.

Geography
Wum is the third biggest town in the north west region of Cameroon. It lies on a plateau at an elevation of about 1100 m near the edge of the western highlands of Cameroon. It lies near Lake Wum, one of five small crater lakes within 15 km of the town in the hilly, volcanic landscape. Lake Nyos, a crater lake from which a limnic eruption killed nearly 2,000 people in 1986, is 25 km to the east.

Population and language
In 2012 Wum's estimated population was 80,123 inhabitants.

The Aghem language, spoken in Wum, is also called Wum.

Culture

References

External links
 Charles Nanga, La réforme de l’administration territoriale au Cameroun à la lumière de la loi constitutionnelle n° 96/06 du 18 janvier 1996, Mémoire ENA. 
 Contrôle de gestion et performance des services publics communaux des villes camerounaises - Thèse de Donation Avele, Université Montesquieu Bordeaux IV 
 Site de la primature - Élections municipales 2002 

Populated places in Northwest Region (Cameroon)
Communes of Cameroon